"Wilson (Expensive Mistakes)" is a song by American rock band Fall Out Boy, released on January 11, 2018, through Island Records and DCD2. It was released as the fifth single from their seventh studio album, Mania. A music video was released with the single.

Composition
Sophie Trenear of The Edge described the song as having a "steadfast pop-punk chorus, while Jake Richardson of Loudwire called the song a "modern emo-pop number".

The song bears a resemblance to The Clash's song "Straight to Hell", as well as British rapper M.I.A.'s song "Paper Planes".

Promotion

TV performances
The band performed the song live on Good Morning America on January 22, 2018, along with "Hold Me Tight or Don't", another single from Mania. On April 17, 2018, the band performed the song on The Late Late Show with James Corden in promotion for the Mania Tour.

Music video
The music video, directed by Jason Lester, was released to Fall Out Boy's Vevo channel on the same day the song was released. It portrays a parody of an infomercial, with the members of Fall Out Boy playing the song and auctioning off items from their past, such as the severed hand from the Young Blood Chronicles musical film. A phone number appears several times in the video. When called, the number allows you to fake "buy" the items on the video.

Reception
Despite the mixed reception of Mania, "Wilson (Expensive Mistakes)" received positive reviews from critics. Anna Gaca of Spin called it the best song on Mania, while feeling it was reminiscent of "The Kids Aren't Alright" from American Beauty/American Psycho. Miles Ricketts of Varsity, in a negative review of Mania, felt that the song was "a comforting reminder" of the band's potential, while praising vocalist Patrick Stump's performance.

Track listing

Personnel
Fall Out Boy 
 Patrick Stump – vocals, rhythm guitar, songwriting, production
 Pete Wentz – bass guitar, songwriting, production
 Joe Trohman – lead guitar, songwriting, production
 Andy Hurley – drums, percussion, songwriting, production

Production
 Dave Sardy - production
 James Monti - engineer
 David Anderson - assistant engineer
 Geoff Neal - assistant engineer
 Neal Avron - mixing engineer
 Cameron Barton - additional engineering

Charts

References

2018 singles
2018 songs
Fall Out Boy songs
Island Records singles
Songs written by Andy Hurley
Songs written by Joe Trohman
Songs written by Patrick Stump
Songs written by Pete Wentz